Curtis Island National Park is on Curtis Island, Queensland, Australia, in the Gladstone Region,  northwest of Brisbane and  southeast of Rockhampton.

The island features coastal heaths, littoral rainforest, sand dunes and beach ridges and salt flats. The national park encompasses the Cape Capricorn headland.

No facilities are provided for campers.  Bush camping is permitted in three camp grounds.

The island is home to a variety of bird species.

The average elevation of the terrain is 16 meters.

Heritage listings
Curtis Island has a number of heritage-listed sites, including:
 Sea Hill Point: Sea Hill Light

See also

 Port of Gladstone
 Protected areas of Queensland
 Yellow chat

References

National parks of Central Queensland
Protected areas established in 1909
1909 establishments in Australia